Marco Gasparri (born 13 October 1988) is an Italian professional football player currently playing for A.C. Legnano. He was born in Tradate.

Honours

Club 
 Monza
Serie D: 2016-17
Scudetto Dilettanti: 2016-17

References

External links

1988 births
Living people
Italian footballers
Como 1907 players
U.S. 1913 Seregno Calcio players
A.C. Monza players
A.C. Legnano players
Serie D players
Serie C players
Association football midfielders